Muscle House or Muscle House by the Sea was a famous (in bodybuilding circles) boarding house on the beach. The building was owned by Fleurette Crettaz, aka "Joy" and was located at 1659 Ocean Front Walk, Santa Monica, California.  Joy was a fan of bodybuilding and would let bodybuilders stay for minimal rent. The house operated from the 1950s to the 1970s. It was a common waypoint for up and coming bodybuilders such as Steve Reeves, Vince Edwards, Jack Delinger, George Eiferman and Dave Draper.

External links 
 Dave Draper's account of his arrival in Santa Monica
 Dave Draper's commentary on a movie role's accuracy
 Powerlifter Bill West staying at Muscle House
 History of Muscle Beach
 History of Muscle Beach part 2
 Ric Drasin account of the '70s
  Steve Reeves History
 Steve Reeves Interview

Bodybuilding
Buildings and structures in Santa Monica, California